The Portuguese Civil Aviation Authority, often shortened to ANAC, is the civil aviation authority of Portugal. It oversees all aspects of civil aviation within the Portuguese territory and all its dependencies.

The ANAC was created on 27 April 2007 to succeed the former National Institute of Civil Aviation  (), which had been created on 15 May 1998 for taking over the General Directorate of Civil Aviation ().

The body is organised into a Directorate Council which is in turn sub-divided into five Directorates and three Cabinets, a Consultant Council, and a Finance Council. It has its headquarters in Lisbon Airport.

See also

List of civil aviation authorities
TAP Air Portugal

References

External links
 ANAC – Autoridade Nacional de Aviação Civil

Government of Portugal
Portugal
Aviation organisations based in Portugal
Civil aviation in Portugal